Otterspool station was a railway station in Liverpool, England. It was located between St Michaels and Aigburth stations on the Garston and Liverpool Railway.

The station opened in 1864 and was absorbed into the Cheshire Lines Committee in 1865. It closed in 1951 due to low passenger numbers. The station was at the end of a long and otherwise empty dirt lane which runs alongside Otterspool Park from Jericho Lane. The lane and the station building still exist, but the main building is now a private dwelling, with a subsidiary building beside it laying derelict. Whatever may remain of the platforms cannot be seen under vegetation.

References

Sources

External links
 The station's history Disused Stations
 The station and local lines on multiple maps Rail Maps Online
 The station on a 25" Edwardian OS Map National Library of Scotland
 The station on line HXS1, with mileages Railway Codes

Disused railway stations in Liverpool
Former Cheshire Lines Committee stations
Railway stations in Great Britain opened in 1864
Railway stations in Great Britain closed in 1951